Charlie Hides (born July 12, 1964) is a British-American drag queen, impersonator, actor, and comedian. Hides is known for his YouTube channel, and his participation in the ninth season of RuPaul's Drag Race. Following live performances in London clubs, Hides started a YouTube channel in March 2011. He has produced hundreds of videos satirizing popular culture, and impersonating celebrities such as Cher, Madonna, Lady Gaga, and Lana Del Rey.

Personal life

Hides was born in Boston, Massachusetts on July 12, 1964. He attended the Massachusetts College of Art and Design.
He currently lives in London and has multiple citizenship, being a citizen of the United States, United Kingdom, and Ireland.

Hides is gay, and in 2004 married his partner James Hides in the town of Provincetown, Massachusetts.

Career

Hides began as a successful drag act in Provincetown, Massachusetts in the 1990s. There he would incorporate live singing as well as comedic skits into his act. This success continued when he moved to London in the 2000s where he began performing on the London cabaret circuit in gay-venues, and legendary drag/cabaret venues, such as The Two Brewers and The Royal Vauxhall Tavern. As his success grew, he became a sensation across the United Kingdom and would regularly tour the UK.

Hides started a YouTube channel after high-definition video uploading became available on the website. Following the creation of his channel, he uploaded some of the videos that he used in live performances and comedy routines. Since Hides created the Charlie Hides TV YouTube channel in March 2011, he has uploaded over 200 videos. These include series such as Madonna/Lady Gaga Nightmares and Shit  Says.

In 2013, Hides uploaded a sketch that starred Australian singer and actress Kylie Minogue. He impersonated Cher during a telephone call with Minogue. In 2015, Hides starred on the TV show Big Brother's Bit on the Side, where he impersonated celebrities whilst commenting on Celebrity Big Brother contestants. Hides also had a cameo role in the film Absolutely Fabulous: The Movie, as a drag performer. In 2014, The Charlie Hides Show aired on London Live as a pilot show, incorporating elements from his live performances and YouTube channel.

Hides has occasionally drawn the attention of some of the acts that he impersonates. In a 2013 interview with the Herald Sun, Cher said that Hides was her "favourite Cher impersonator". When Lady Gaga was in London, she sent flowers to Hides, alongside a note. Hides has also stated that Liza Minnelli, Elton John and Kris Jenner have been "very kind".

In 2019, Hides' began regularly performing and hosting 'Drag Queen Bingo' and saw instant success with every show selling out that he began taking it across the United Kingdom. 'Drag Queen Bingo' would become Hides' regular show, taking over from his evening cabaret shows, and in 2020 he set up the company dragqueen.bingo.

RuPaul's Drag Race

On February 2, 2017, Logo TV announced that Hides would participate as a contestant in the ninth season of American reality competition RuPaul's Drag Race. As of 2017, Hides is the oldest contestant to participate on Drag Race. The season premiered on March 24, 2017, on VH1. In an interview with BBC News Newsbeat, Hides said:

On the fourth episode of the show, entitled "Good Morning Bitches", Hides was eliminated from the competition. He was placed in the bottom two by the judges, and therefore had to participate in a "Lip-Sync for Your Life" to Britney Spears' "I Wanna Go" against fellow contestant Trinity Taylor. Hides commented on the lip-sync, saying that the self-described "disaster" was a result of having a fractured rib, due to a cheerleading challenge several episodes prior. In the episode's challenge, Hides was critiqued for his performance in the talk show segment of the episode. The morning after his elimination, Hides uploaded a music video for his new single, "The Dame".

Controversy

In December 2015, Hides was accused of using blackface and ethnic stereotypes to represent one of his characters, Laquisha Jonz. An activist, Chardine Taylor-Stone, launched a petition on the website Change.org, calling for the Royal Vauxhall Tavern, and other venues, to cancel Hides' performances. Taylor-Stone claimed that the character was "a racist act based on misogynist stereotypes of black working class women, it is outdated, offensive, shameful and has no place in the LGBT Community". As a result, Hides stated that he will no longer use the character in his performances.

Filmography

Television

Film

Discography and parodies

Awards and nominations

References

External links
 
 

American drag queens
American satirists
Living people
1964 births
American YouTubers
American costume designers
American people of Irish descent
American people of British descent
Comedians from London
Comedians from Massachusetts
American gay actors
British gay writers
LGBT YouTubers
Gay comedians
LGBT people from Massachusetts
English LGBT rights activists
American LGBT rights activists
British LGBT screenwriters
Male actors from Boston
Male actors from London
Male actors from Massachusetts
Massachusetts College of Art and Design alumni
People from Boston
Television personalities from London
Charlie Hides
21st-century American comedians
English drag queens
American LGBT comedians
British LGBT comedians